LCH may refer to:

Places 
County Hall, London, London, UK
Lake Charles (Amtrak station), Louisiana, United States; Amtrak station code LCH
Lake Charles Regional Airport, Lake Charles, Louisiana (IATA airport code)

Companies & organizations 
Lexington Catholic High School, Lexington, Kentucky, United States
LCH (clearing house), a UK financial institution

Military 
HAL Light Combat Helicopter
Balikpapan-class landing craft heavy, officially known as Landing Craft, Heavy or LCH

Science & technology 
Langerhans cell histiocytosis, a type of cancer
Life-cycle hypothesis, a model of economic consumption
Locally Compact Hausdorff space, a term used in mathematics
LCHab, a representation of CIELab colours in a cylindrical diagram
LCHuv, a representation of CIELuv colours in a cylindrical diagram